Allama Sayyid Abu al-fadl Burqai (19 June 1908 – 1993) (also spelled as Abul Fazl Borqei or borghei or borghaii) was an Ayatollah in Qom.  who was critical of Shiite beliefs. He left Shī’aism and converted to Sunnīsm, after carefully studying the Qur'an. He authored 40 books refuting Shi'ism, after previously writing 30 books trying to defend Shi'ism. Subsequently, he was repeatedly harassed by Shias and eventually had to leave Qom.

Birth
Allama Sayyid Abu al-fadl Burqa'i was an Iranian clerk and religious scholar. He was born at Qom on 19 June 1908. His father name was Sayyid Hassan who was the son of a religious scholar Sayyid Ahmed. His mother Skeena Sultan was the daughter of a well-known cleric.

Education
When he was ten or twelve years old, he got admission into Madrassah Radvi and continued his religious studies there. He authored a number of books, among these books 35 are in defense of Shiah and later, he wrote 40 books in which he criticized shiahs rituals and dogmas. He was a teacher or professor at the Qom Howzah Elmieh Qom, where he taught Rasael, makaseb and fiqh for more than 20 years. Due to his reformist views he was soundly beaten there in Qom Howzah by seminarians and was fired from the Howzah by Ayatollah Borojredi. He became prayer leader of Masjid Wazeer guzar Daftar in Tehran, where he continued his work as a leader of Jummah prayer and congregational prayers for 27 years.

Borqei wrote against the erroneous beliefs and aberrations in religious practices among his Shia countryman. He was considered the most learned mujtahid by many Iranians. He was against seeking the help of imams in prayers.

Tabishi az Qur'an
Tabishi az Qur'an is the commentary of Quran with simple Persian translation by Sayyid Abu al-Fadl Burqa’i. The book was written in 1386/1966, several editions have appeared under a penname. Unlike most of the commentators Burqa'i has tried to find the real meaning and interpretation of Quran using Quranic verses. This tafseer is 2200 pages long.

Bibliography

Books written by Ayatollah Borqei
 Sawam e ayam dar zendegie Burqei - His autobiography
 Osoole deen az nazare quran
 Barresi elmi dar ahadith mahdi
 Tabeshi az qoran - a tre volume tafsir of the quran
 Tazade mafatih al janan ba ayat qoran
 Khorafat vofoor dar ziyarat ghoboor
 darsi az velayat
 Dua
 doahayi az qoran
 Doaa nodbeh va khorafate an
 Arze akhbare osool bar qoran va oqool
 Faribe jadid dar etelafe tathlith va touhid
 Quran baraye hameh
 Goftegooyee ba hafez

Books translated by Ayatollah Borqei
 Ahkam quran by Al-Shafi‘i
 Rahnamood sonnat dar radde ahle bedat - is a farsi translation and summary of Ibn Taymiyyah famous refutation of Shia Islam Minhaj as-Sunnah an-Nabawiyyah

References

20th-century Muslim scholars of Islam
1908 births
1993 deaths
People from Qom
Iranian grand ayatollahs